An armpit fart is a simulation of the sound of flatulence made by creating a  pocket of air between the armpit of a partially raised arm and the hand, then swiftly closing the pocket by bringing the arm close to the torso, causing the air to push against the skin, creating the noise. Often used for humorous and comedic effect, armpit farts can be considered juvenile or crude. Flatulence-related humor is the oldest recorded in the world.

The sound produced by armpit farting can accompany singing or other rhythm.

See also
 Manualism (hand music)

References

Flatulence humor
Hand gestures